The Iran men's national under-23 volleyball team represents Iran in international men's volleyball competitions and friendly matches under  the age 23 and it is ruled by the Iranian Volleyball Federation.

Results

FIVB U23 World Championship
 Champions   Runners up   Third place   Fourth place

Asian U23 Championship
 Champions   Runners up   Third place   Fourth place

Asian Championship
 Champions   Runners up   Third place   Fourth place

Team

Current squad
The following is the Iranian roster in the 2019 Asian Men's Volleyball Championship

Head coach:

Head coaches

References

External links
Official website

National men's under-23 volleyball teams
Volleyball in Iran
Under-23
Men's sport in Iran